Ethmiopsis tegulifera is a moth in the family Gelechiidae. It was described by Edward Meyrick in 1932. It is found in the Russian Far East (Ussuri), Korea and Japan.

The wingspan is 13–14.5 mm. The forewings are white, with scattered dark fuscous scales. The posterior two-thirds of the costa is dark brown with a white stigma. The hindwings are grey.

The larvae feed on Quercus mongolica and Quercus serrata.

References

Ethmiopsis
Moths described in 1932
Taxa named by Edward Meyrick